The 9th Central Committee of the Chinese Communist Party was in session from 1969 to 1973. It was preceded by the 8th Central Committee of the Chinese Communist Party.  It was the second central committee in session during the Chinese Cultural Revolution. Even amidst partial cultural disintegration, it was succeeded by the 10th Central Committee of the Chinese Communist Party.  It held two plenary sessions in the 4-year period.

It elected the 9th Politburo of the Chinese Communist Party in 1969.

This committee had 170 members and 109 alternate members.

Members
Mao and Lin were the party chairman and vice-chairman. The remainder are listed in stroke order of surnames:

Chronology
1st Plenary Session
Date: April 28, 1969
Location: Beijing
Significance: Mao Zedong and Lin Biao were respectively appointed chairman and vice-chairman of the CCP Central Committee. 25-member Politburo, 5-member Politburo Standing Committee and other central organs were elected. Mao Zedong made a speech emphasizing the need to unite after the early turbulent years of the Cultural Revolution.
2nd Plenary Session
Date: August 23–September 6, 1970
Location: Lushan
Significance: The necessity to establish new Party committees after they were disbanded at the beginning of the Cultural Revolution was pointed out. It was decided to convene the 4th National People's Congress "at an appropriate time". A "1970 Plan for National Economy" by the State Council and a report to intensify "preparedness against war" by the Central Military Commission were adopted. Chen Boda proposed to appoint a State President, but Mao Zedong opposed. According to the official CCP historiography, Lin Biao attempted a later aborted "coup" during this meeting.

External links
 9th Central Committee of the CCP, People's Daily Online.

Central Committee of the Chinese Communist Party
1969 establishments in China
1973 disestablishments in China